The American Beethoven Society is an international organization dedicated to the creative genius of Beethoven, whose music speaks to the heart and mind of humanity.

The Society's primary work is the creation and support of a comprehensive collection of Beethoven materials at the Ira F. Brilliant Center for Beethoven Studies, which is housed at San Jose State University, San Jose, California. The center is the largest research institution in the Americas devoted solely to the life, works, and accomplishments of Ludwig van Beethoven. Today the collection contains more 31,000 items, including more than 360 first editions and 3,500 early editions of Beethoven's musical scores, some original Beethoven manuscripts, a large collection of Beethoven related books, sculpture and artwork, and sound and visual media, and Beethoven relia (including 2 locks of his hair and one of his shirts).

The Society co-publishes the internationally acclaimed Beethoven Journal, which appears two times a year and contains a wide range of articles, reviews of books, sound recordings, and videos, bibliographies of new books, and news of interest to all Beethoven lovers.

References

American Beethoven Society - external linkIra F. Brilliant Center for Beethoven Studies

Tourist attractions in Silicon Valley
Ludwig van Beethoven
Music fan clubs
Celebrity fandom
San Jose State University
Culture of San Jose, California
Museums in San Jose, California
Music museums in California
Biographical museums in California
Tourist attractions in Santa Clara County, California